Plant City Stadium is a stadium in Plant City, Florida with a capacity of about 6,000. It was built in 1988 as the new spring training home of the Cincinnati Reds, who had previously trained at Al Lopez Field in nearby Tampa for many years. In 1998, the Reds left Plant City for Ed Smith Stadium in Sarasota. After the departure of the Reds, Plant City Stadium mainly hosted local amateur baseball and softball games.

In 2012, the stadium became the home pitch for several VisionPro Institute developmental soccer teams, including VSI Tampa Bay FC of USL Pro, VSI Tampa Bay FC of the USL Premier Development League, and VSI Tampa Bay FC of the USL W-League. In early 2020, the Tampa Bay Vipers of the XFL renovated and took over the facility for use as its practice facilities. Starting in the Spring of 2023, Plant City Stadium will be the home to the Four Corners Upper School Coyotes Baseball Team.

References

External links
City of Plant City: Plant City Stadium
Ballpark Reviews: Plant City Stadium
Digital Ballparks: Plant City Stadium

Cincinnati Reds spring training venues
Grapefruit League venues
Sports venues in the Tampa Bay area
Minor league baseball venues
1988 establishments in Florida
Sports venues completed in 1988
Soccer venues in Florida
Plant City, Florida